Evangelia (Evelina) Papazoglou (born 14 January 1995) is a Greek synchronized swimmer. She competed in the women's duet at the 2016 Summer Olympics. Her partner was Evangelia Platanioti. They finished in 10th place.

In 2018, Papazoglou and Platanioti finished in 6th place in the duet technical routine at the 2018 European Aquatics Championships. In the duet free routine they finished in 5th place.

References

1995 births
Living people
Greek synchronized swimmers
Olympic synchronized swimmers of Greece
Synchronized swimmers at the 2016 Summer Olympics
Synchronized swimmers at the 2020 Summer Olympics
Place of birth missing (living people)
Synchronized swimmers at the 2017 World Aquatics Championships
Artistic swimmers at the 2019 World Aquatics Championships
20th-century Greek women
21st-century Greek women